Arthur Briggs (30 November 1867 – 18 August 1943) also known by the nickname of "Spafty", was an English rugby union footballer who played in the 1890s. He played at representative level for England, and at club level for Bradford F.C., as a half-back, e.g. scrum-half, or fly-half, i.e. number 9, or 10. Prior to Tuesday 27 August 1895, Bradford F.C. was a rugby union club, it then became a rugby league club, and since 1907 it has been the association football (soccer) club Bradford Park Avenue.

Background
Arthur Briggs was born in Bradford, West Riding of Yorkshire, and he died aged 75 in Bradford, West Riding of Yorkshire.

Playing career

International honours
Arthur Briggs won caps for England while at Bradford F.C. in the 1892 Home Nations Championship against Wales, Ireland, and Scotland.

Change of Code
When Bradford F.C. converted from the rugby union code to the rugby league code on Tuesday 27 August 1895, Arthur Briggs would have been approximately 27. Consequently, he may have been both a rugby union and rugby league footballer for Bradford F.C.

References

External links
Search for "Briggs" at rugbyleagueproject.org
Search for "Arthur Briggs" at britishnewspaperarchive.co.uk
Search for "Spafty Briggs" at britishnewspaperarchive.co.uk

1867 births
1943 deaths
Bradford F.C. players
England international rugby union players
Rugby league players from Bradford
English rugby union players
Rugby union halfbacks
Rugby union players from Bradford